Eggs and bacon may refer to:

 Eggs and bacon, a part of a full breakfast
 Eggs-and-bacon, a common name for various plants with yellow and red flowers in the family Fabaceae
 Egg and bacon, a nickname for the colours (gold and scarlet) of the Marylebone Cricket Club
 Eggs and Bacon Bay,  a community in Tasmania